Strypi is a two-stage US sounding rocket. Its first stage consists of two Recruit, the second of one Castor. It is 31 inches (79 centimeters) in diameter, and has a maximum flight height of 124 miles (200 kilometers).

It was originally designed and built in 1962 by teams from the Sandia National Laboratories in an around-the-clock program that was a part of a larger nuclear weapons testing program, undertaken prior to the imposition of the Limited Test Ban Treaty (LTBT) in October, 1963. It was designed to take a nuclear warhead into space for extra-atmospheric testing. Though it performed this function only once, in Test Checkmate of Operation Fishbowl, it became the "workhorse" of Sandia's rocket research program. The rocket's name came from the efforts of the Sandia teams, which had "taken the tiger by the tail".

In 1968, a modified Strypi was used in Material Test Vehicle (MTV) booster tests. Although atmospheric nuclear testing was now banned, as a part of the Test Readiness Program the U.S. Air Force continued to develop the means of testing, should the ban be lifted.

American target missile. Family of re-entry vehicle test boosters and anti-missile targets using a Castor first stage with two recruit strap-ons, plus a range of upper stages.

Derivatives
The SPARK, also known as the Super Strypi, is a three-stage derivative of the Strypi powerful enough to place a 250 kg payload into Sun-synchronous orbit. The Super Strypi was first launched on 3 November 2015, although on that test the first stage failed soon after lift-off.

References

External links
Article title

Sounding rockets of the United States
Sandia National Laboratories